Farel Dalrymple is an American artist and alternative comics creator. He is best known for his award-winning comics series Pop Gun War.

Career
Originally from Oklahoma "by way of California", Dalrymple is one of the founders of the New York City-based Meathaus Collective. He attended New York's School of Visual Arts as an Illustration major and has been creating comics since 1999.

Dalrymple currently resides in Portland, Oregon, where he is working on the second volume of Pop Gun War, to be published by Dark Horse Comics, as well as illustrating the ten-issue series Omega the Unknown, written by author Jonathan Lethem and published by Marvel Comics. He describes his work style as "fourteen-hour workdays filled with ecstasy, torment, and procrastination."

Awards
Dalrymple has received several awards, including a Xeric Foundation grant, a 2002 Society of Illustrators Gold Medal, and a Russ Manning Award nomination. An excerpt of Omega the Unknown was selected for the anthology Best American Comics 2010.

Bibliography

Early work
Behold 3D: "Sunship G'Hide-E1" (a, with Curt Fischer and Ray Zone, anthology, Edge, 1996)
Proverbs & Parables (w/a, among other artists, 144 pages, New Creation, 1998)
Supermundane (w/a):
Smith's Adventures in the Supermundane (one-shot, Cryptic Press, 1999)
Supermundane #1-30 (irregular webcomic published on Dalrymple's and Meathaus' websites, 2000–2005)
Dark Horse Maverick: Happy Endings: "Happy Ending" (anthology graphic novel, 96 pages, 2002)
Pop Gun War #1-5 (w/a, Cryptic Press (#1) and Absence of Ink (#2-5), 2000–2002)
 Reprinted by Dark Horse,  as Pop Gun War (tpb, 136 pages, 2003)
 Reprinted by Image as Pop Gun War: The Gift (tpb, 144 pages, 2016)

Meathaus Press
Meathaus (w/a, anthology):
 "Honkey. Like donkey but with an "H"" (in #1, 2000)
 "Rejection" (also the back cover illustration, in #2, 2000)
 "We're all out" (also editor of the issue, in #3, 2000)
 "Ms. Umbrella — part one" (also editor of the issue, in #4, 2001)
 "Ms. Umbrella pt. 2 — grab your elbow skin" (also editor of the issue, in #5, 2001)
 "The Regular" (in #6, 2002)
 "Centillion" (in Love Songs (#7), 2004)
 "i don't like anybody except for people i like" (also editor of the issue, in Headgames (#8), 2006)
 "fotologica" (in S.O.S., anthology graphic novel, 276 pages, Nerdcore, 2008)
Beef Apt. #1-2 (w/a, collective sketchbooks — five pages of Dalrymple's drawings in each, 2002–2004)
Go for the Gold #1-4 (w/a, collective sketchbooks, 2004–2011)
Spigot (w/a, convention zine, 2006)

Dark Horse & Image Comics
Grendel: Red, White and Black #4: "Devil's Retribution" (a, with Matt Wagner, anthology, 2002)
 Reprinted in Grendel: Red, White and Black (tpb, 200 pages, 2005)
 Reprinted in Grendel Omnibus Volume 1: Hunter Rose (tpb, 600 pages, 2012)
AutobioGraphix: "The Tree" (a, with Richard Doutt, anthology graphic novel, 104 pages, 2003)
24Seven Volume 1: "Pirhanas" (a, with Jasen Lex, anthology graphic novel, 224 pages, 2006)
MySpace Dark Horse Presents (anthology):
 "Moist: Humidity Rising" (a, with Zack Whedon, in #17, 2008) collected in Volume 3 (tpb, 168 pages, 2009)
 "Em and Gwen in: Magic Spell" (w/a, in #21, 2009) collected in Volume 4 (tpb, 176 pages, 2009)
Prophet (w/a, with Brandon Graham and Simon Roy + Giannis Milonogiannis (#45), Extreme Studios, 2012–2014) collected in:
 Remission (includes #24, tpb, 136 pages, 2012)
 Brothers (includes #29, tpb, 172 pages, 2013)
 Joining (includes #45, tpb, 168 pages, 2015)
Island #4-5, 10, 14-15: "Pop Gun War" (w/a, anthology, 2015–2017) collected as Pop Gun War: Chain Letter (tpb, 176 pages, 2017)
Thought Bubble Anthology #5: "Nancy Boy" (a, with Rick Remender, 2015) collected in Thought Bubble Anthology (tpb, 136 pages, 2016)
Proxima Centauri #1-6 (w/a, 2018) collected as Proxima Centauri (tpb, 160 pages, 2019)
From Hell's Heart: "Typee" (a, with Herman Melville and John Arcudi, anthology graphic novel, 128 pages, A Wave Blue World, 2019)

DC Comics & Marvel Comics
Caper #1-4 (of 12): "Market Street" (a, with Judd Winick, 2003–2004)
Bizarro World: "Dear Superman" (a, with Dylan Horrocks, anthology graphic novel, 200 pages, 2005)
Omega the Unknown vol. 2 #1-10 (a, with Jonathan Lethem, 2007–2008) collected as Omega the Unknown (hc, 256 pages, 2008)
House of Mystery vol. 2 #22: "Fig and Strawberry" (a, with Matthew Sturges, co-feature, Vertigo, 2010) collected in Volume 5: Under New Management (tpb, 160 pages, 2011)
Marvel Knights: Strange Tales II #2: "You Won't Feel a Thing" (w/a, anthology, 2011) collected in Strange Tales II (hc, 144 pages, 2011, ; tpb, 2011)
The Unexpected: "The Land" (a, with Joshua Dysart, anthology one-shot, Vertigo, 2011) collected in The Unexpected (tpb, 160 pages, 2013)
Fantastic Four #600: "Remember" (a, with Jonathan Hickman, co-feature, 2012) collected in Fantastic Four by Jonathan Hickman Volume 2 (hc, 832 pages, 2014)
The New Avengers vol. 2 #34 (a, with Brian Michael Bendis, among other artists, 2013) collected in Volume 5: End Times (hc, 112 pages, 2013, ; tpb, 2013)
Wolverine and the X-Men vol. 2 #11 (a, with Jason Latour, among other artists, 2014) collected in Volume 2: Death of Wolverine (tpb, 144 pages, 2015)

Other publishers
Typewriter #6: "Untitled" (w/a, with David Youngblood, anthology, Popzero, 2004)
Jenny Finn: Messiah (a, with Mike Mignola and Troy Nixey, one-shot, Boom! Studios, 2005)
Project: Superior (w/a, AdHouse Books):
Project: Superior: "Hollis" (anthology graphic novel, 288 pages, 2005)
Superior Sampler #2: "The Awesomest Super Guy, Hollis in: Shadowsmen" (2007)
Pop Gun War: Percevil (w/a, webcomic, Top Shelf 2.0, 2009)
VICE (w/a, webcomics):
 Blood Sisters (2009)
 Untitled (2011)
 Level 72 (2012)
Papercutter #14: "Live with Our Clerics" (w/a, anthology, Tugboat Press, 2010)
It Will All Hurt #1-6 (w/a, webcomic, Study Group Comics, 2012–2015)
 Published by Study Group as a three-issue mini-series in printed form.
 Collected by Image as a trade paperback (144 pages, 2018)
The Wrenchies (w/a, graphic novel, 304 pages, First Second, 2014)
 Includes short story "fotogloctica" from Meathaus S.O.S. anthology.
 See also: Remainder: A Wrenchies Story (TOR.com, 2014).
Locust Moon:
Quarter Moon #4: "The Often Wrong" (w/a, anthology, 2014)
Prometheus Eternal: "Prometheus is Here!" (a, with Grant Morrison, anthology one-shot, 2014)
Little Nemo: Dream Another Dream: "Slumberland" (w/a, anthology graphic novel, 144 pages, 2014)
Captain Victory and the Galactic Rangers vol. 2 #3 (a, with Joe Casey, Nathan Fox and Jim Mahfood, Dynamite, 2014)
Palefire (a, with M. K. Reed, graphic novel, 68 pages, Secret Acres, 2015)
Cayrels Ring #1: "Chapter Five" (a, with Shannon Lentz, Kickstarter, 2018)

Covers only
Getting the Sex out of the Way #1 (Meathaus Press, 2002)
The Guild: Bladezz #1 (Dark Horse, 2011)
Prophet #23, 40 (Image, 2012–2013)
Once Upon a Time Machine Volume 1-2 gn (Locust Moon, 2012–2018)
Deadly Class #1 (Image, 2014)
Draw! #28 (TwoMorrows, 2014)
Island #3 (Image, 2015)
Seven to Eternity #3, 7 (Image, 2016–2017)
Doom Patrol vol. 6 #5 (DC's Young Animal, 2017)
Death or Glory #3 (Image, 2018)
Black Hammer: Age of Doom #6 (Dark Horse, 2018)
Grumble #3 (Albatross Exploding Funny Books, 2019)

References

External links
 
 Sample comics pages - Sample illustrations
 Farel Dalrymple profile at Lambiek
 January 2002 interview with Dalrymple at PopImage
 March 2003 interview with Dalrymple at PopImage

Alternative cartoonists
Artists from Portland, Oregon
School of Visual Arts alumni
Living people
1972 births